Back on the Dancefloor is the second compilation album released by German dance trio, Cascada. It was released 13 April 2012 in their home country. Consisting of 2 discs featuring past singles and remixes from the previous eight years. The album's first and only new song, Summer of Love was released prior to the compilation and peaked within the top 20 in Germany.

Content
The album consists of fourteen singles and one new song, Summer of Love. The singles include the global hits "Evacuate The Dancefloor", "Everytime We Touch", and "What Hurts The Most". Unlike the previous compilation disc available with Original Me, it features the group's debut single "Miracle".

Singles
"Summer of Love", was released 30 March 2012 and charted at #13 in Germany and Switzerland. It reached #7 in Austria, the single's highest position.

Track list

CD 1

CD 2

Chart performance

Release History

References 

2012 albums
Cascada albums

pl:Szablon:Cascada
pt:Predefinição:Cascada